"I Hope I Never" is a 1980 song by New Zealand art rock group Split Enz. It was released in May 1980 as the second single from their sixth studio album True Colours.

Track listings

Australian release
Side A
"I Hope I Never" - 3:56 (Tim Finn)
Side B
"Hypnotised" (Tim Finn)
"Carried Away" (Neil Finn)

International release
Released in the US and in the Netherlands with the same track listing, but different artwork.
"I Hope I Never" - 3:56 (Tim Finn)
"The Choral Sea" - 4:38 (Eddie Rayner)

Personnel
 Tim Finn — vocals, piano
 Noel Crombie — vocals, percussion
 Eddie Rayner — vocals, keyboards
 Malcolm Green — vocals, drums
 Nigel Griggs — vocals, bass

Charts

Cover Versions
 Colleen Hewett from her album, Colleen (1983)
 ENZSO (1995), a collaboration between Split Enz's Eddie Rayner and the New Zealand Symphony Orchestra.  The cover featured New Zealand singer Annie Crummer on vocals, changing only the lyrics to refer to herself as an "optimistic woman" rather than a man.
 Australia's Tina Arena recorded the song in 2008 with the London Studio Orchestra for her album Songs of Love & Loss 2, and similarly changed the lyrics to reflect her gender.
 Lisa Miller covered the song on the 2011 tribute album They Will Have Their Way.

Notes

APRA Award winners
Split Enz songs
1980 singles
1983 singles
Songs written by Tim Finn
1980 songs
Colleen Hewett songs
Mushroom Records singles